Giorgio Bongiovanni (born 4 March 1926) was an Italian basketball player. He competed in the men's tournament at the 1952 Summer Olympics.

References

1926 births
Living people
Italian men's basketball players
Olympic basketball players of Italy
Basketball players at the 1952 Summer Olympics
Sportspeople from Bologna